Louis Van de Perck (14 October 1889 – 30 November 1953) was a Belgian archer and Olympic champion. He competed at the 1920 Summer Olympics in Antwerp, where he won a gold medal with the Belgian team, and also two individual silver medals.

References

1889 births
1953 deaths
Belgian male archers
Olympic archers of Belgium
Archers at the 1920 Summer Olympics
Olympic gold medalists for Belgium
Olympic medalists in archery
Medalists at the 1920 Summer Olympics
Olympic silver medalists for Belgium